Janelle Anya Monique Atkinson-McClave (born 30 September 1982), née Janelle Anya Monique Atkinson, is a Jamaican former competitive swimmer who won three silver medals at the 1999 Pan American Games. At the 2000 Summer Olympics in Sydney, she became the first Jamaican swimmer to finish in the top four of any swimming event at an Olympic Games, placing fourth in the 400-metre freestyle.

Early years 

Atkinson was born in Saint Andrew, Surrey, Jamaica in 1982.

International career 

At the 1999 Pan American Games in WinnipegManitoba, Atkinson was a three-time silver medalist, finishing third in each of the 200-, 400- and 800-metre freestyle events.  Atkinson represented Jamaica at the 2000 Summer Olympics in Sydney, Australia, where she finished fourth in the 400-metre freestyle and ninth in the 800-metre freestyle. She was the first Jamaican swimmer to finish in the top four at an Olympic Games.  Atkinson won a pair of bronze medals in the 400-metre freestyle and 800-metre freestyle at the 2002 Commonwealth Games held in Manchester, England.  She also competed in the 200-metre freestyle and 400-metre freestyle for the Jamaican team at the 2004 Summer Olympics in Athens, Greece.  She was named Jamaica's Swimmer of the Year seven consecutive times from 1997 to 2003. Contrary to popular belief, Janelle is not related to Alia Atkinson who coincidentally is also a Jamaican swimmer.

College career 

She attended the University of Florida in Gainesville, Florida, where she swam for coach Gregg Troy's Florida Gators swimming and diving team in National Collegiate Athletic Association (NCAA) competition from 2001 to 2004.  As a Gator swimmer, Atkinson won three Southeastern Conference (SEC) championships (twice in the 500-yard freestyle and once in the 1,650-yard freestyle), and received ten All-American honors.  She graduated from Florida with a bachelor's degree in tourism and hospitality management in 2005.

Coaching 

In 2014, Atkinson became the head coach of Swimming and Diving at Fairfield University. Before going to Fairfield, she was an assistant swimming coach for the UConn Huskies women's swimming and diving team at the University of Connecticut in Storrs, Connecticut.  For the four years prior to accepting the UConn job, she served as an assistant swimming coach at Wright State University in Dayton, Ohio.  She also served as the head coach of the Jamaican women's national team at the 2009 World Aquatics Championships.

In 2017, Atkinson was named the head coach of the Stony Brook University swimming and diving team. Atkinson was fired from the program less than a year later after allegations of abusive behavior towards her swimmers. Atkinson, in turn, sued the university for gender and racial discrimination. The university settled, not clearing Atkinson of the abuse allegations and "expressly denied any wrongdoing."

See also 

 List of Commonwealth Games medallists in swimming (women)
 List of Jamaican records in swimming
 List of University of Florida alumni
 List of University of Florida Olympians

References

External links 

  Janelle Atkinson – University of Florid athlete profile at GatorZone.com

1982 births
Living people
Jamaican female swimmers
Jamaican female freestyle swimmers
Florida Gators women's swimmers
Jamaican swimming coaches
Olympic swimmers of Jamaica
Pan American Games silver medalists for Jamaica
Commonwealth Games bronze medallists for Jamaica
People from Saint Andrew Parish, Jamaica
Stony Brook Seawolves swimming coaches
Swimmers at the 1999 Pan American Games
Swimmers at the 2000 Summer Olympics
Swimmers at the 2002 Commonwealth Games
Swimmers at the 2003 Pan American Games
Swimmers at the 2004 Summer Olympics
Wright State Raiders swimming coaches
Commonwealth Games medallists in swimming
Pan American Games medalists in swimming
UConn Huskies swimming coaches
Fairfield Stags swimming coaches
Medalists at the 1999 Pan American Games
Medallists at the 2002 Commonwealth Games